Orophus is a small genus of katydids native to Mexico, Central America, and South America.

Description and habitat
Katydids in this genus have an elongated head with ovoid eyes. The ovipositor is medium-sized, slightly crenulated, curving upwards, and one fifth of the length of the posterior femur. They are found in the understory rather than in the canopy in contrast with other members of the subfamily Phaneropterinae.

Taxonomy
The group was originally named in 1859 by Swiss entomologist Henri Louis Frédéric de Saussure as a subgenus of Phylloptera. It was erected as a separate genus in 1869 by British entomologist Francis Walker. It is in the tribe Amblycoryphini within the subfamily Phaneropterinae. The type species is Orophus mexicanus (originally Phylloptera mexicana). Other genera with species previously placed in Orophus include Eurycorypha and Microcentrum.

, the genus includes seven species split into three species groups:

Species group Orophus mexicanus
Species in this group are light green to yellowish in coloration.
Orophus amazonicus Cadena-Castañeda, 2014 – Colombia
Orophus guatemalae (Saussure & Pictet, 1897) – Central America
Orophus mexicanus (Saussure, 1859) – Mexico, Central America

Species group Orophus ovatus
This species group has variable coloration.
Orophus ovatus (Brunner von Wattenwyl, 1878) – Costa Rica

Species group Orophus tessellatus
Species in this group are quite variable in their coloration and the density of the spots on the forewings, ranging from light to dark green, yellow, pink, or brown.
Orophus andinus Cadena-Castañeda, 2014 – Colombia
Orophus conspersus (Brunner von Wattenwyl, 1878) – Central America and northern South America
Orophus tessellatus (Saussure, 1861) – Mexico, Central America, and South America

References

Phaneropterinae
Orthoptera of North America
Orthoptera of South America